is a Japanese voice actor and narrator. After he graduated from the Osaka University of Arts, he was initially represented by the REM talent agency. However, since May 2007, he has been affiliated with Kekke Corporation.

Filmography

TV anime
2007
Gin Tama as Kamemiya

2008
Black Butler as Vincent Phantomhive (Ciel's father)
Nodame Cantabile: Paris-hen as Theo
Rosario + Vampire Capu2 as Zashiki-warashi
Toradora! as Hisamitsu Noto

2009
Hanasakeru Seishōnen as Izmal
Modern Magic Made Simple as Karl Cristbarth
Yu-Gi-Oh! 5D's as Leo (ep.85)

2010
Kaichō wa Maid-sama! as Kenta; Kouma Yafu "Kou"; Yūta Utsumi
Ladies versus Butlers! as Akiharu Hino
Sekirei: Pure Engagement as Yōichi Kimura
Sengoku Basara: Samurai Kings 2 as Akagawa Motoyasu
Shiki as Seishin Muroi 
The Qwaser of Stigmata as Tasuku Fujiomi

2011
Bakuman. 2 as Kim Sunggyu
Ben-To as Ren Nikaidou
Cross Fight B-Daman as  Laigo Ogra
Hanasaku Iroha as Haruhiko Komatsu
Heaven's Memo Pad as Satoshi Teraoka
Last Exile: Fam, the Silver Wing as Luscinia Hāfez

2012
Bakuman. 2 & 3 as Ichiriki Orihara; Kim Sunggyu
JoJo's Bizarre Adventure: Phantom Blood as Jonathan Joestar
Sket Dance as Jin Kakiuchi
Uchuu Kyoudai as Rick

2013
Arpeggio of Blue Steel as Gunzō Chihaya
Brothers Conflict as Masaomi Asahina
Genshiken Nidaime as Harunobu Madarame
Inazuma Eleven GO: Galaxy as Gandales Baran
Makai Ouji: Devils and Realist as Ernest Crosby
Futari wa Milky Holmes as John
Train Heroes as Sam

2014
Argevollen as Masaru Okui
Black Bullet as Kazumitsu Tendō
Cardfight Vanguard: Legion Mate as Raul Sera
Gundam Build Fighters Try as Minato Sakai
K: Missing Kings as Nagare Hisui
Minna Atsumare! Falcom Gakuen as Dark Fact-sensei
Mobile Suit Gundam-san as Garma-san
Nanana's Buried Treasure as Isshin Yuiga
Nobunaga Concerto as Ikeda Tsuneoki
Shirobako as Shimeji Maitake, Kenichi Mimura, Young Isamu Momose, Wataru Nakabayashi, Composer Manager
Witch Craft Works as Kyōichirō Mikage
Your Lie in April as Saitō

2015
Okusama ga Seitokaichou! as Hayato Izumi
Aoharu × Machinegun as Nagamasa Midori
Charlotte as Kazuki Tomori
Gate as Kouji Sugawara
Is It Wrong to Try to Pick Up Girls in a Dungeon? as Kashima Oka
Gin Tama as Ayao Sarutobi (Male)
K: Return of Kings as Nagare Hisui
Overlord as Peter Mork
Prison School as Reiji "Andre" Andō
The Rolling Girls as Shidô
Star-Myu: High School Star Musical as Seishiro Inumine
The Testament of Sister New Devil BURST as Leohart
Go! Princess PreCure as Wataru Kaido

2016
Aokana: Four Rhythm Across the Blue as Kazunari Shindō
BBK/BRNK as Akihito Tsuwabuki
Gate: Jieitai Kanochi nite, Kaku Tatakaeri - Enryuu-hen as Kouji Sugawara
Kuma Miko: Girl Meets Bear as Yoshio Amayadori
Orange as Saku Hagita
Tanaka-kun Is Always Listless as Shimura
Berserk as Serpico
Handa-kun as Takao Kawafuji
Touken Ranbu: Hanamaru as Hachisuka Kotetsu

2017
Fuuka as Kazuya Nachi
ID-0 as Ido
Star-Myu: High School Star Musical 2 as Seishiro Inumine
Altair: A Record of Battles as Konstantinos

2018
Idolish7 as Banri Ogami
Touken Ranbu: Hanamaru 2 as Hachisuka Kotetsu
Sword Art Online Alternative Gun Gale Online as M
Sword Gai: The Animation as Kazumo 
Back Street Girls as Kazuhiko Sugihara
Cells at Work! as Cedar Pollen
High Score Girl as Miyao
Run with the Wind as Yuki

2019
Fire Force as Karim Fulham
Fruits Basket as Hatori Sōma
Fairy Gone as Jonathan Passepierre
7 Seeds as Mark Ibaraki
Star-Myu: High School Star Musical 3 as Seishiro Inumine
Wasteful Days of High School Girls as Masataka "Waseda" Sawatari
Babylon as Ariyoshi Hanta
My Hero Academia 4 as Taishiro Toyomitsu / Fat Gum

2020
number24 as Ethan Taylor
Appare-Ranman! as Seth Rich Cutter
Cagaster of an Insect Cage as Jin
Haikyu!! To The Top as Daishou Suguru
IDOLiSH7: Second Beat! as Banri Ogami
Tower of God as  Evan Edroch
The Millionaire Detective Balance: Unlimited as HEUSC
Magatsu Wahrheit -Zuerst- as Conrad

2021
IDOLiSH7: Third Beat! as Banri Ogami
Cute Executive Officer as Futo-Riiman (Fat Salaryman)
So I'm a Spider, So What? as Hyrince Quarto
Duel Masters King!, Jendol
Higehiro as Yoshida
The Way of the Househusband as Masa
How Not to Summon a Demon Lord Ω as Gewalt
Full Dive as Amos
How a Realist Hero Rebuilt the Kingdom as Hakuya Kwonmin
Night Head 2041 as Michio Sonezaki
Muteking the Dancing Hero as Vivi

2022
Love After World Domination as Hayato Ōjino
Aoashi as Kenta Yoshitsune
Vermeil in Gold as Shinōji Ryūga
My Stepmom's Daughter Is My Ex as Mineaki Irido
The Prince of Tennis II: U-17 World Cup as Alexander Amadeus
Shinobi no Ittoki as Iboro
Blue Lock as Zantetsu Tsurugi
Play It Cool, Guys as Sōta Shiki

2023
Sugar Apple Fairy Tale as Elliot Collins
Mahō Shōjo Magical Destroyers as Nick

Anime films
Josee, the Tiger and the Fish (2020) as Hayato Matsūra
Sing a Bit of Harmony (2021) as Gocchan
Eien no 831 (2022) as Seri Agawa
The Seven Deadly Sins: Grudge of Edinburgh (2022) as Priest

Video games
Brothers Conflict:Brilliant Blue (2012) as Masaomi Asahina
Brothers Conflict:Passion Pink (2013) as Masaomi Asahina
JoJo's Bizarre Adventure: All Star Battle (2013) as Jonathan Joestar
Aokana: Four Rhythm Across the Blue (2014) as Kazunari Shindō
J-Stars Victory Vs (2015) as Jonathan Joestar
JoJo's Bizarre Adventure: Eyes of Heaven (2015) as Jonathan Joestar
IDOLiSH7 (2015) as Banri Ogami
Overwatch (2016) as Lúcio (Japanese dub)
OZMAFIA!! (2016) as Kyrie
Ao no Kanata no Four Rhythm - EXTRA1 (2017) as Kazunari Shindō
Food Fantasy (2018) – Chocolate, Plum Juice, Tempura
Spider-Man (2018) as Peter Parker / Spider-Man (Japanese dub)
Nioh 2 (2020) as Azai Nagamasa
My Hero One's Justice 2 (2020) as Taishiro Toyomitsu / Fat Gum
Saint Seiya Awakening (2020) as Hypnos
Gate of Nightmares (2021) as Oristhor
Ao no Kanata no Four Rhythm - EXTRA2 (2022) as Kazunari Shindō
Soul Hackers 2 (2022) as Zenon

Unknown date
Akane-sasu Sekai de Kimi to Utau as Akechi Mitsuhide
Bloodstained: Ritual of the Night as Johannes
Dragalia Lost as Ku Hai
Fate/Extella as Archimedes
The Order: 1886 as Marquis de Lafayette (Japanese dub)
Touken Ranbu as Hachisuka Kotetsu
Warriors All-Stars as Shiki
Ephemeral -FANTASY ON DARK- as Rei

Drama CDs
Aokana: Four Rhythm Across the Blue as Kazunari Shindō
Flutter as Yoshino
Meshiagare Ai Wo as Harufumi Shunzei
NightS - Kanjou Spectrum as Nakaya
Uso Mitai na Hanashi Desu ga as Nakamura
Datte Maou-sama wa Kare ga Kirai as Mao
Strawberry Chocolate Vanilla as Mine
Koi wa Baka de Aru Koto as Maki
Kashikomarimashita, Destiny (side:Butler) as Ichirou Miyauchi
Kashikomarimashita, Destiny -Answer- as Ichirou Miyauchi
Lovesick Ellie as Sumi Shioda

Dubbing roles

Live-action
The 100 as Finn Collins (Thomas McDonell)
The Big Bang Theory as Raj Koothrappali (Kunal Nayyar)
Crisis on Earth-X as Mon-El (Chris Wood)
The Heat as Jason Mullins (Michael Rapaport)
A Melody to Remember as Second Lieutenant Han Sang-yeok (Im Si-wan)
Only the Brave as Brendan McDonough (Miles Teller)
Supergirl as Mon-El (Chris Wood)
The Twilight Zone as A. Traveler (Steven Yeun)
When the Game Stands Tall as Danny Ladouceur (Matthew Daddario)

Animation
Solar Opposites as Terry

References

External links

1980 births
Living people
Japanese male video game actors
Japanese male voice actors
Male voice actors from Hyōgo Prefecture
21st-century Japanese male actors